Judy Spreckels (née Powell, December 9, 1931 – December 15, 2015) was an American writer, publisher and trial historian. She was a friend of Elvis Presley during the rock 'n' roll singer's rise to stardom.

Spreckels' relationship with Elvis Presley
Spreckels describes herself as having been like a sister to Presley when he was about 21 and she was three years older. According to her own account, she was "a companion, confidante and keeper of secrets in the exciting days of his early career". At that time, "Elvis was surrounded by the first wave of what would become known as the Memphis Mafia." She says that she "was with him and the guys all the time." They drove bumper cars in Las Vegas, rode horses in California and hung out at Graceland. "There wasn't a crowd then, just a few guys," and she emphasizes that she "had nothing to do with being a yes man for him and obviously he trusted me." She also claims that Presley told her secrets "that I never told and will never tell." In 1956, the singer sat for a portrait she drew. He inscribed it, "To Judy Spreckels, I love you, baby. Elvis Presley." For this drawing and a photograph of her with Presley, see also Judy Spreckels, "Elvis Presley: His Favorite Picture." Modern Screen, May 1957. In February 1957, the same magazine included the article, "Elvis And Me" describing her as "Elvis' No.1 fan."

On June 11, 1956, Time magazine ironically reported:
Scampering aboard a plane in Los Angeles, impulsive Judy Spreckels, 24, ex-wife of Sugar Daddy Adolph B. Spreckels Jr., was soon in Memphis and the offices of the daily Press-Scimitar. She had learned that a photograph, made last month in Las Vegas, showing her with dreamboat Groaner Elvis Presley, 21, had appeared in the newspaper, and she had hopped to Tennessee to buy some copies of that edition. Was she in love with Presley (TIME, May 14) ? "Oh, no, he's too young," cooed Judy.

When Presley and Spreckels visited Graceland, she said, "We stayed up all night listening to Elvis singing and playing the piano. He liked to sing hymns. ... He introduced me to Amazing Grace." She also went to the funeral of his mother Gladys in 1958, saying  "I have never seen anyone as sad as Elvis was ... He grieved. He cried continuously. We were in the front hall at Graceland, and he stood there hugging me for a half-hour. He was crying and crying and crying. It was the saddest thing I'd ever seen." In a letter of August 25, 1958, Presley's manager Colonel Tom Parker confirms that Judy Spreckels came "to Memphis to be with Elvis for the Funeral [,] this was very kind of her also. And I know Elvis did appreciate this so very much."

Spreckels also remembers that in Los Angeles, where Elvis made movies, she went out on a Sunday with him and his friend, actor Nick Adams. Another time, the trio went horseback riding and were captured in a photograph at the ranch. This snapshot shows Spreckels smiling up adoringly at Presley. She is in the possession of many photographs showing the star looking at her all the time, "and he was laughing. It was just such a fun time." "We loved each other," she says. "But it was just a really terrific friendship."

In 1956, during Elvis' first engagement in Las Vegas, visitors to the shows included Judy Spreckels, Hal Wallis (who had just signed Elvis to his first movie deal) and entertainers Ray Bolger, Phil Silvers and Liberace. In later years, Spreckels still attended Presley's Las Vegas concerts, and he would stop the show to introduce her to the audience. She had married by then and so had he.

Writer, publisher and trial historian
For a while Spreckels ran a small publishing company and edited Horses magazine in California. In 1966, she wrote an eloquent article about the late National Horse Show Jumper champion, Ben O'Meara. She also worked as a ghostwriter of books.

As a trial historian, Spreckels has "been attending Los Angeles-area trials off and on for forty-six years."

Horse ranch
In 1978, Spreckels sold horses and spent the next two years resting at her horse ranch in Las Vegas and at home in Beverly Hills. Soon after, this ranch was sold.

At the time of her death, Spreckels lived in the San Fernando Valley.

Notes

References
Judy Spreckels, "Elvis and Me." Modern Screen, February 1957.
Judy Spreckels, "Elvis Presley: His Favorite Picture." Modern Screen, May 1957.
CBS News: Linda Deutsch, "Elvis' Gal Pal Shares Memories", Los Angeles, August 12, 2002. © MMII The Associated Press.

External links
CBS News: Elvis' Gal Pal Shares Memories
North West Cable News: Elvis' close friend breaks silence

1931 births
2015 deaths